Charles John Allen (2 September 1862 – 1956) was a British sculptor, and a figure in the New Sculpture movement.

Biography
Born in Greenford, Middlesex, Allen studied at the Lambeth School of Art and then apprenticed with the London architectural sculpture firm Farmer & Brindley in 1879, becoming the assistant to Hamo Thornycroft for four years. In 1894 Allen moved to Liverpool, where he spent more than thirty years as a respected teacher at the University of Liverpool and Vice-Principal at the Liverpool School of Architecture and Applied Arts, which became the Liverpool School of Art in 1905.

Allen died in 1956 at Farley Green, Albury, Surrey, where he had lived with his sister since the death of his wife, shortly after his retirement from teaching.

Notable work
 The 1906 monument to Queen Victoria, Liverpool, Allen's masterwork
 Two allegorical panels for St. George's Hall, Liverpool, 1894
 The John Heminges and Henry Condell Memorial, London; dated 1895, unveiled 1896.
 Marble reredos at St Paul's Cathedral, London
 Wood carvings at St Albans Cathedral
 Work at the Liverpool University College (now University of Liverpool) with architect Alfred Waterhouse, 1895
 Frieze for the Royal Insurance Building, Liverpool, c. 1897
 Panels and other work for the Peres Bank, Leicester, c. 1900
 War memorial for Eastham Village, 1924
 Architectural sculpture for the Mersey Docks and Harbour Board Building, 1927
 Choir stall canopies and the font in Ullet Road Unitarian Church, Liverpool

Gallery

References

External links

 
 Portrait of Allen

1862 births
1956 deaths
20th-century English sculptors
19th-century English sculptors
19th-century English male artists
20th-century English male artists
Alumni of the Lambeth School of Art
British architectural sculptors
English male sculptors
People from Greenford
Sculptors from London